Delta Air Lines Flight 30 was a scheduled international passenger flight from Atlanta, Georgia, to London, England. On April 18, 2018, the Airbus A330-323 operating the flight experienced an engine fire after takeoff from Atlanta. The aircraft immediately returned to Atlanta and made an emergency landing. All 288 people on board survived without any injuries. However, the aircraft was substantially damaged, and the National Transportation Safety Board (NTSB) classified the event as an accident. This accident occurred one day after Southwest Airlines Flight 1380 also experienced an engine failure, albeit more severe which depressurized the cabin and killed a passenger.

Aircraft and crew 
The aircraft involved was an Airbus A330-323 registered as N806NW that was originally delivered to Northwest Airlines in 2004. In 2009 the aircraft was transferred to Delta following its merger with Northwest. It was powered by two Pratt & Whitney PW4168A turbofan engines and was 14 years old at the time of the accident.

The flight crew consisted of two captains, one of whom was also a line check airman, and two first officers, one a relief crew member. The captain and pilot in command was 60-year-old Daniel Hancock, who was undergoing his first line check on the Airbus A330. He had 18,730 flight hours, including 260 hours on the Airbus A330. He occupied the left seat.

The captain/line check airman was 62-year-old James Miller, who was monitoring Hancock's progress. Miller had 15,906 flight hours and was seated in the cockpit jump seat.

The first officer in the cockpit at the time was 50-year-old John Prendergast, who had logged 9,056 flight hours with 748 of them on the Airbus A330.

The relief first officer was 39-year-old Iyob Makonnen, who had 4,740 flight hours.

Accident 
Flight 30 departed Atlanta at 17:51 EST and took off at 18:09 EST. (right) engine caught on fire, indicated by the fire alarm sounding and an engine no 2 fire message being displayed on the A330's electronic centralized aircraft monitor (ECAM). The crew of another aircraft also reported seeing thick smoke emitting from the engine. The flight crew declared an emergency to air traffic control and requested to land on 27L using a longer approach so that the necessary checklists could be performed. The flight crew also noted that there would be "hot brakes," likely indicating that maximum braking would be used on landing. Airport rescue and firefighting (ARFF) vehicles were alerted of the situation. At 18:34, 25 minutes after takeoff, the aircraft landed on runway 27L and was met by the ARFF vehicles, which extinguished the no 2 engine. The aircraft then returned to the gate where the passengers disembarked.

Passengers on board the flight took videos of the engine failure. A news photographer on board said that the crew was able "to keep everyone calm" and that nobody panicked.

Investigation 
The accident is being investigated by the National Transportation Safety Board (NTSB) with assistance from the French Bureau of Enquiry and Analysis for Civil Aviation Safety (BEA). On October 6, 2021 the public docket was released, containing details about the crew, interviews, engine reports, and other pertinent information.

The cockpit voice recorder (CVR) was unusable as the data from the accident flight had been overwritten by other recordings. This was one of several occurrences in which pertinent CVR data was lost (all of the occurrences involved two-hour recorders, which met the current requirements) listed in a 2018 NTSB report calling for 25-hour cockpit voice recorders.

On May 10, 2022, the NTSB released their final report on the accident, stating that the engine fire had been caused by a faulty fire isolation component and a failure in the fuel system wiring. The accident was worsened by the flight crew's decision to delay the landing believing the fire was extinguished when in fact the fire indicator loops were damaged preventing further warnings.

Aftermath 
The passengers were later put on another Delta Air Lines flight to London.

N806NW was repaired and returned to service with Delta Air Lines. Delta continues to use the flight number 30 on the same route.

See also 

 American Airlines Flight 383 (2016)
 British Airways Flight 2276
 Korean Air Flight 2708
 Southwest Airlines Flight 1380
 United Airlines Flight 328

References

External links 
 NTSB investigation docket
Video of the engine fire on twitter
 

Accidents and incidents involving the Airbus A330
Aviation accidents and incidents in the United States in 2018
2018 in Georgia (U.S. state)
Airliner accidents and incidents caused by engine failure
30
April 2018 events in the United States
Airliner accidents and incidents in Georgia (U.S. state)
Airliner accidents and incidents caused by pilot error